Provincial road 34-27, named the Samadıra–Kartal connector, is a  highway that connects the otoyol O-4 to the state highway D.100 in Istanbul, Turkey. A provincial road is governed under the responsibility of the respective Turkish provincial government, and bears the license plate number of that province in the road identification number's first half. It is one of the three connectors between the two roads in the Istanbul metropolitan area. The route begins at exit K2 on the O-4 and heads south through two large parks, the Kayışdağı and Aydos forests, until reaching Kartal and connecting to the D.100. After the interchange, the connector becomes Sanayi Cad. ("Industry Avenue") and continues as a surface street. The connector was built in 1991.

Exit list

References

Provincial roads in Turkey
Transport in Istanbul Province
Sancaktepe
Kartal